Séamus Brennan (16 February 1948 – 9 July 2008) was an Irish Fianna Fáil politician who served as Minister for Arts, Sport and Tourism from 2007 to 2008, Minister for Social and Family Affairs from 2004 to 2007, Minister for Transport from 1989 to 1992 and 2002 to 2004, Government Chief Whip from 1997 to 2002, Minister of State at the Department of Enterprise and Employment from 1993 to 1994, Minister for Education from 1992 to 1993 and Minister of State at the Department of Industry and Commerce from 1987 to 1989. He served as a Teachta Dála (TD) for the Dublin South constituency from 1981 to 2008. He also served as a Senator from 1977 to 1981, after being nominated by the Taoiseach.

Early life
Brennan was born in Galway in 1948. He was educated at St. Joseph's Patrician College in Galway. He attended University College Galway, graduating with a Bachelor of Commerce in 1968 and a Bachelor of Arts (Economics) the following year. He attended University College Dublin too. He qualified as an accountant. Brennan found an interest in politics during his teens when he canvassed for Fianna Fáil during elections. In 1973, he succeeded Tommy Mullins as General Secretary of Fianna Fáil. He began to revamp the party structure; this included setting up a youth section and a national executive. He studied and was impressed by the 1976 United States presidential election. He applied new techniques such as marketing strategies and opinion polls to the 1977 general election. This resulted in the biggest-ever parliamentary majority for any party; Fianna Fáil and Jack Lynch were back in power with a 20-seat majority. Brennan was appointed to Seanad Éireann as a Senator.

Political career
In 1979, Brennan supported George Colley in the Fianna Fáil leadership contest caused by the retirement of Jack Lynch. However, Charles Haughey was narrowly elected as leader and a new Secretary General of the party was appointed. At the 1981 general election, Brennan was elected to Dáil Éireann for the Dublin South constituency and was returned at every subsequent election until his death in 2008. In the early 1980s, he was a prominent member of the Gang of 22 who tried unsuccessfully to wrest control of the Fianna Fáil party from Haughey. He supported Colley and later Desmond O'Malley in various leadership heaves during those years. It was widely expected that Brennan would join the Progressive Democrats when they were founded by O'Malley in 1985, but instead he remained within Fianna Fáil.

In 1987, Fianna Fáil party were returned to office and Brennan was appointed Minister of State with responsibility for Trade and Marketing. In 1989, he became a full cabinet Minister when he was appointed Minister for Tourism and Transport. In 1991, his brief was widened when the Communications portfolio came under his control. In 1992, Albert Reynolds succeeded Haughey as Taoiseach. Brennan was one of the few ministers in Haughey's Cabinet who remained in Reynolds' new government. He was appointed Minister for Education. In 1993, a Fianna Fáil–Labour Party coalition came to power and Brennan was demoted to Minister of State for Commerce and Technology. He remained in this position until 1994.

In 1995, Fianna Fáil were again in opposition, and the new party leader Bertie Ahern designated Brennan as Opposition Spokesperson for Transport, Energy and Communications. In 1997, Fianna Fáil returned to power and Brennan became Minister of State at the Department of the Taoiseach. He became the Minister for Transport in 2002.

In the cabinet reshuffle of September 2004, Brennan was moved to the post of Minister for Social and Family Affairs. He was bitterly disappointed but he refused to describe it as a demotion. After the 2007 general election, he played a key role in the negotiations with the Green Party which led to the formation of the new Government. He did not seek ministerial office in Brian Cowen's cabinet and tendered his resignation on 6 May 2008, for medical reasons.

Death
Brennan died in the early hours of 9 July 2008 at his home in Churchtown in Dublin. He had been suffering from cancer. He is survived by his wife Ann, their two sons and four daughters. Taoiseach Brian Cowen said Brennan would be remembered as "a brilliant political strategist, a dedicated constituency TD, a reforming minister and a very popular colleague".

By-election
His death brought about a by-election at which his son Shay Brennan was the unsuccessful Fianna Fáil candidate. It was won by George Lee of Fine Gael.

References

 

1948 births
2008 deaths
Alumni of University College Dublin
Alumni of the University of Galway
Councillors of Dublin County Council
Deaths from cancer in the Republic of Ireland
Deaths from prostate cancer
Fianna Fáil senators
Fianna Fáil TDs
Government Chief Whip (Ireland)
Irish accountants
Members of the 14th Seanad
Members of the 22nd Dáil
Members of the 23rd Dáil
Members of the 24th Dáil
Members of the 25th Dáil
Members of the 26th Dáil
Members of the 27th Dáil
Members of the 28th Dáil
Members of the 29th Dáil
Members of the 30th Dáil
Ministers for Education (Ireland)
Ministers for Social Affairs (Ireland)
Ministers for Transport (Ireland)
Ministers of State of the 25th Dáil
Ministers of State of the 27th Dáil
Ministers of State of the 28th Dáil
Nominated members of Seanad Éireann
People educated at St Joseph's Patrician College
People from Galway (city)
Irish political consultants
Politicians from County Galway
People from Dundrum, Dublin